Finnicization (also finnicisation, fennicization, fennicisation) is the changing of one's personal names from other languages (usually Swedish) into Finnish. During the era of National Romanticism in Finland, many people, especially Fennomans, finnicized their previously Swedish family names.

Some of these people were descended from Finnish-speaking farmers, who had previously changed their Finnish names to Swedish ones after climbing society's ladder. This was an understandable stratagem, as official positions (and even many trades) were only open to those speaking Swedish, and a Finnish name would have been an impediment to success.

A notable event in finnicization was the centenary, in 1906, 100 years after the birth of the philosopher and statesman Johan Vilhelm Snellman. Author Johannes Linnankoski encouraged Finns to give up their Swedish names on 12 May, Snellman's birthday. During 1906 and 1907 about 70,000 Finns changed their names.

Finnicized names

See also 
Finnicization of Helsinki

References 
 Sukunimien muutokset (List of finnicized names)

Social history of Finland
Finnish nationalism
Finnish language
Cultural assimilation